The Stereotyped Nature-Inspired Aerial Grasper or SNIAG is a robotic created like a bird perching. The SNIAG was created by Dr. William Roderick, a researcher in the Department of Mechanical Engineering at Stanford University.

References 

Robotics projects